Albert Diaz (born 1960) is a United States circuit judge of the United States Court of Appeals for the Fourth Circuit. Diaz is the first Hispanic judge to serve on the Fourth Circuit. Prior to his appointment to the Court of Appeals, Diaz was a North Carolina state superior court judge and an appellate judge for the Navy-Marine Corps Court of Criminal Appeals.

Early life and education 
Raised in Brooklyn as the son of divorced Puerto Rican parents, Diaz and his two brothers were raised by his mother. After graduating high school, he enlisted in the U.S. Marines. Diaz earned a Bachelor of Science degree in economics from the Wharton School of the University of Pennsylvania in 1983 and earned a Juris Doctor from New York University School of Law in 1988. Diaz earned a Master of Science degree from Boston University, in 1993. Diaz also served with the Marines from 1988 to 1995 as a judge advocate, retiring as a lieutenant colonel, USMCR.

Professional career
While in the Marines, Diaz served as a prosecutor, defense lawyer and judge. He left the service in 1995 for private practice, becoming an associate with the law firm of Hunton & Williams and represented Philip Morris USA during tobacco lawsuits in the late 1990s. From 2000 to 2005, he served as a military judge for the U.S. Navy-Marine Corps Trial Judiciary and as an appellate judge for the U.S. Navy-Marine Corps Court of Criminal Appeals.

Judicial career

State court service 

In 2001, then-North Carolina Gov. Mike Easley appointed Diaz to the North Carolina Superior Court, making Diaz the first Hispanic ever to be a state judge in North Carolina. The following year, Diaz lost a bid for election. However, Easley again appointed Diaz to the Superior Court. Then, in 2005, the North Carolina Supreme Court chief justice appointed Diaz to be Charlotte, North Carolina's first ever Business Court judge, one of just three in the state.

Federal judicial service 

On November 4, 2009, President Barack Obama nominated Diaz to be a United States circuit judge of the United States Court of Appeals for the Fourth Circuit, to replace Judge William Walter Wilkins, who assumed senior status in July 2007 and later retired.

The nomination, made along with that of fellow North Carolina nominee James A. Wynn, Jr., was jointly endorsed by North Carolina senators Kay Hagan, a Democrat, and Richard Burr, a Republican. He had a hearing before the Committee on December 16, 2009. He was heard along with fellow nominee James Wynn by just three of the Committee members. When asked about his judicial philosophy, Diaz said: "We're not simply dealing with an academic exercise, but we're affecting people's lives in each and every case". The Senate Judiciary Committee voted 19–0 on January 28, 2010, to send his nomination to the Senate floor.

A combination of secret holds and the threat of filibuster by Republicans caused Democratic Senate Majority Leader Harry Reid not to bring Diaz's confirmation to a vote for nearly eleven months. On December 18, 2010, the Senate confirmed Diaz by a voice vote. He received his commission on December 22, 2010.

Awards and associations 
 Vice-president of the North Carolina Bar Association
 Member, ABA Judicial Division
 Member of the NCBA Hispanic-Latino Lawyers Committee
 Member of the NCBA Minorities in the Profession Committee
 Member of the Hispanic National Bar Association
 Member of the Continuing Judicial Education Committee, North Carolina Conference of Superior Court Judges
 Member of the American College of Business Court Judges
 Member of the Mecklenburg County Bar Nominating Committee
 Member of the Special Committee on Diversity
 Secretary, Chief Justice William H. Bobbitt Inn of Court

See also 

List of Hispanic/Latino American jurists
List of first minority male lawyers and judges in New York
List of Puerto Ricans

References

External links 

Diaz's Public Questionnaire Available Here
Questions for the Record Available Here

1960 births
21st-century American judges
American people of Puerto Rican descent
Boston University School of Management alumni
Hispanic and Latino American judges
Judges of the United States Court of Appeals for the Fourth Circuit
Living people
New York University School of Law alumni
North Carolina state court judges
Superior court judges in the United States
United States court of appeals judges appointed by Barack Obama
United States Marines
Wharton School of the University of Pennsylvania alumni